Mode III may refer to:
 Mousterian or Mode III, archaeological culture's method of fabricating flint tools
 Mode III crack or tearing mode of propagation of a fracture